Bluebird is the fifteenth studio album by American country artist Emmylou Harris, released on January 10, 1989, by Warner Records. Featuring mostly interpretations of work by artists such as the McGarrigle Sisters, Tom Rush, and Rodney Crowell, it included her most recent top-ten country-charting single, "Heartbreak Hill". The album enjoyed renewed interest in 2004 when "Heaven Only Knows" was used in the first episode of the fifth season of The Sopranos.

Bonnie Raitt provided guest vocals on the track "Icy Blue Heart". Billboard said in their review of the album that, "Like most of Emmylou Harris' albums, Bluebird is an expertly performed album, featuring some truly startling and affecting tour de forces" (sic).

Track listing

Personnel
Richard Bennett - acoustic guitar, bass, guitar, mandolin, percussion, electric guitar, 12-string guitar, producer
Ashley Cleveland - background vocals
Donivan Cowart - background vocals, engineer
Paul Dieter - mixing assistant
Glen Duncan - mandolin
Steve Fishell - acoustic guitar, dobro, pedal steel, electric bass, electric guitar
Emory Gordy, Jr. - conductor, string arrangements
Caroline Greyshock - photography
Glen Hardin - synthesizer, piano
Emmylou Harris - acoustic guitar, guitar, percussion, vocals, producer
Mike Henderson - slide guitar
Kieran Kane - mandolin
Mary Ann Kennedy - background vocals
Paul Kennerley - acoustic guitar
Janet Levinson - art direction, design
Kenny Malone - percussion
Carl Marsh - synthesizer, Hammond organ
George Massenburg - mixing
Anna McGarrigle - background vocals
Kate McGarrigle - accordion, background vocals
Glenn Meadows - mastering
Mark O'Connor - mandolin
Eric Paul - assistant engineer
Dave Pomeroy - electric bass, acoustic bass, bass violin
Bonnie Raitt - background vocals, slide guitar
Sharon Rice - mixing assistant
Mark Richardson - engineer
Pamela Rose - background vocals
Harry Stinson - background vocals
Marty Stuart - mandolin
Barry Tashian - acoustic guitar, background vocals
Billy Thomas - percussion, drums, vocals

Charts

Weekly charts

Year-end charts

References

Emmylou Harris albums
1989 albums
Albums produced by Richard Bennett (guitarist)
Warner Records albums